Kokkilai or Kokilai or Kokkulaay ( Kokkuḷāy Sinhalese: කෝකිලායි) is a town in the Mullaitivu District, Sri Lanka. It is located about 40 km south-east of the District capital Mullaitivu. It is a coastal town, located next to Kokkilai lagoon, it is also close to Trincomalee District border.

See also 

 1984 Kokkilai massacres (army)
 1984 Kokkilai massacre (LTTE)
 1985 Kokkilai Offensive

Towns in Mullaitivu District
Maritimepattu DS Division